Maarja Nummert (born 24 April 1944, near Antsla) is an Estonian architect who has designed a number of school buildings. She has received several awards for her work, sometimes using wood for village schools such as the one in Hageri where some of the rooms are circular providing a more attractive environment for the children. She also designed the Salem Baptist Church in Tartu which is known for its fine acoustics.

References

1944 births
Living people
People from Antsla
Estonian architects
Estonian women architects
Estonian Academy of Arts alumni